Mail Today is a news outlet currently publishing an e-paper and news website from Delhi, covering politics, entertainment, cinema, automobiles, fashion and lifestyle. It was established in November 2007. Its predecessor was the Today newspaper run by the India Today Group. The paper version was shut down during the Covid-19 lockdown in August 2020. Mail Today is published by the India Today Group in a joint venture with British newspaper Daily Mail (which is part of the Associated Newspapers Group). Associated Newspapers held a 26% stake in the paper, which it had bought at 180 million.

Editors

 Bharat Bhushan: 2007–2011
 Sandeep Bamzai: 2012–2015
 Abhijit Majumder: 2015–2018
 Dwaipayan Bose: 2018–2020

References

External links
 Mail Today website
 Mail Today, ePaper

English-language newspapers published in India
India Today Group
Newspapers published in Delhi
Publications established in 2007
2007 establishments in Delhi